AMA Superbike Championship is an American motorcycle racing series that has been run every year beginning in 1976. For most of its existence it has been considered the premier motorcycle road racing series in the United States. It is sanctioned by the AMA American Motorcyclist Association since its inception, and the promotion of the series has been licensed to several organizations over the years. Since 2015 the series has been run and promoted by MotoAmerica, who also manage several other AMA professional road racing championships, including the popular 600cc Supersport class. 

The AMA Superbike Championship was created in 1976 as a new motorcycle road racing series taking advantage of the newest large displacement production road-going motorcycles of up to 1000cc's that were increasingly popular with American riders. The series was initially called "Superbike Production" and was initially modeled on a regional series that had been run in California in the previous years. Up until this the most prestigious racing series in the United States was the AMA Grand National Series which required competition in five different formats 1/4 mile, 1/2 mile, 1 mile and TT courses, which were all run on dirt ovals, and pavement racing.  Europe, under the guidance of the FIM, or Fédération Internationale de Motocyclisme, had a much more developed motorcycle road racing world championship, but it didn't include any American venues in the series. 

In 1986, the AMA recognized the changing nature of motorcycle racing by making the Grand National Championship into a dirt-track-only series; road-racing rounds were branched off into a separate championship which was named the AMA Superbike Championship. The fact that the rules were set up to compete using the same large displacement production bikes that people saw in the showrooms quickly made the series popular with fans, racers and after several seasons motorcycle manufacturers took a direct interest and began sponsoring teams and riders.

History

1976 to 1982: The 1000cc era 
At the inception of the series there was stiff competition between the more experienced teams racing European twin cylinder bikes, which included the BMW R90S, Ducati and MotoGuzzi motorcycles and the teams racing the more powerful Japanese inline fours from Kawasaki, Suzuki, Honda and Yamaha.  While the Japanese bikes produced more horsepower, the European bikes tended to have superior handling.  The inaugural series in 1976 was won by rider Reg Pridmore on a BMW R90S owned by Team Butler and Smith. European machines won every race in 1976 and the first half of the 1977 series, but after two seasons of work the Team Racecrafters Kawasaki KZ 1000, again piloted by Reg Pridmore, won the first race for the Japanese.  With the advent later that year of the better handling Suzuki GS 1000, the less powerful twin-cylinder European bike's race domination was over. 

As the series gained more and more attention in America the factories took note, and in 1980 Honda entered the series with a factory team and brought a top rider from their stable, Freddie Spencer, to compete on their behalf.  Up until this point Honda and the other Japanese manufacturers were more focused on the International Grand Prix and in particular its premier 500cc Series, which was run on purpose built 500cc racing motorcycles.  By 1980 the 500cc class was completely dominated by two-stroke machines, which at the same time had been phased out for road use in many countries.  The American Superbike Series was suddenly more relevant and appealing to manufacturers.

1983 to 2002: The 750cc rule and the age of the Homologation Specials 
The speeds that the 1000cc four cylinder bikes producing up to 150 horsepower were able to achieve were overwhelming the stock frames, suspension and tires of the era.  Thus for 1983 the AMA, working with the top teams, decided to reduce the maximum capacity of the Superbike class to 750cc.  

Honda, which had been competing in the series on their CB 750F was ready with a new bike in 1983, initially planned as a "homologation special" that is, a bike which is built in just enough numbers to satisfy the production rule. (Typically 5,000 units sold worldwide).
That bike, the Honda Interceptor VF750F was a huge departure from the air-cooled, two valve per cylinder CB-750F.  It featured a square tube steel perimeter frame which wrapped around the outside of the engine, rather than the older hidden round-tube frames.  It was a water cooled V4 with four valves per-cylinder.  Originally Honda had planned only to make enough to meet the requirement for production racing, but the bike was extremely popular, even at the price which was higher than the older CB-750, and it went into full production.  Honda was unsuccessful in winning the championship with the new bike in 1983, as Wayne Rainey riding on Team Muzzy Kawasaki GPz 750 won the inaugural 750cc Superbike championship, but Honda went on to win the next five years in a row of series championships with the Interceptor. 

As the popularity of the series grew the long established Daytona 200 motorcycle race, which had begun on a course constructed on the beach in 1935, and had moved to the asphalt auto-racing track in 1961, switched to Superbikes.   The race had been one of the few venues where FIM style Formula 1 500cc machines raced in the United States, but by 1988 the speeds the machines were reaching on the high-banked tracks were simply too high for safety given the tire technology of the time.  In 1985 the race format moved from GP bikes to Superbikes, and it became part of the AMA Superbikes series. This increased the visibility of Superbikes even further, and cemented in the minds of many Americans that the Superbikes were now the de facto premier motorcycle racers, eclipsing the FIM 500cc series, with their unavailable two-stroke racing machines.

2003 to 2008: Return of the liter class
In late 2002 AMA Pro Racing, the promoter in charge of the AMA Superbike Championship at the time decided to open up the series to 1000cc production bikes. Their plan called for allowing near-stock 1000cc machines to compete against the then-current state of the art 750cc Superbikes that were the incumbent series competition machines.  In addition, they would be allowed to increase their capacity to 800cc.    The complicated rules allowed "claiming" of the 1000cc stock machines, a technique where competitors can buy the winning machine from the owner for a set amount of money, and intended to keep modifications down in near-stock racing classes.  Ultimately this complicated mix of machines and rules was not liked by many of the competitors.  In 2006 Ducati withdrew factory support from AMA Superbike racing, and in 2008 Honda followed suit.

2009 to 2014: Daytona Motorsports Group

From 2009 to 2014, the Daytona Motorsports Group was the organizer under supervision of the AMA.  The AMA, not pleased with motorcycle counts and participation in their events, stripped the DMG organization of the sanction and awarded it to a new organization led by Wayne Rainey, KRAVE, with assistance from Dorna (which organises the FIM MotoGP and World Superbike Championships).

2015 to Present: MotoAmerica takes charge, FIM alignment
KRAVE organized multiple championship road racing series for the AMA, which are collectively known as the MotoAmerica Road Racing Series beginning in 2015.

MotoAmerica chose to align the multiple racing classes closely with those used by FIM, which simplifies the work that manufacturers must do to compete in both series.  

 Superbike (matches FIM regulations)
 Stock 1000 (FIM Superstock 1000)
 Supersport (FIM Supersport, 600cc to 750cc)
 Twins (800cc, two cylinder)
 Junior Cup (FIM Supersport 300, 300cc to 500cc)

The most successful riders included Doug Chandler, Scott Russell, Ben Spies, Miguel Duhamel and Mat Mladin, who holds several series records including seven championships. Five non-Americans won the title – Englishman Reg Pridmore, Australians Mat Mladin and Troy Corser, Canadian Miguel Duhamel, and Spaniard Toni Elías.

Television rights are held by MotoAmerica, but can currently be seen on FOX Sports 1 & 2, MAVTV Network, MotoAmerica's Facebook page, MotoAmerica's Youtube Channel, and MotoAmerica's LIVE+ App.

See also
 List of AMA Superbike champions
 AMA Pro Daytona Sportbike Championship
 AMA Supersport Championship

References

External links

Superbike Champions at SportNetwork.net

 
Motorcycle road racing series